İsgəndərli (also, Iskenderli and Iskandarry) is a village and municipality in the Masally Rayon of Azerbaijan.  It has a population of 2,378.

References 

Populated places in Masally District